Jon Wolfe is an American country music singer-songwriter.

Career
Jon Wolfe was born in Tulsa, Oklahoma and raised in Miami, Oklahoma. He grew up singing in church and was first interested in classic pop music. His stepfather, a bass player in a house band with Joe Don Rooney, introduced him to country music.

Wolfe worked as an oil trader in Chicago, Illinois and transferred to Houston, Texas in 2003, where he roomed with Hayes Carll. He was inspired to become a working musician after attending an Alabama concert in Texas where he was invited on the tour bus and sang with Teddy Gentry and John Rich. He settled in Austin, Texas and became a regular performer on the Lone Star honky tonk circuit. He was nominated for Best Country Act in both Houston and Tulsa, Oklahoma and opened shows for Merle Haggard, Dwight Yoakam, Asleep at the Wheel and George Strait.

Wolfe self-released his debut album, Almost Gone, in November 2004. A 2006 show in Nashville, Tennessee led to a record deal with Midas Records Nashville. He recorded an album for the label produced by Keith Follesé and Brad Allen. The label went out of business in 2008 and the album went unreleased. "She Won't Be Lonely Long", which was scheduled to be the album's first single, became a top 5 song for Clay Walker in 2010.

Wolfe continued performing and wrote songs for himself and other artists. Joe Nichols recorded Wolfe's song "I Can't Take My Eyes Off You" on his 2011 album It's All Good. After a showcase performance at South by Southwest in 2010, Wolfe signed with Lex Music Group for management and formed his own record label, Fool Hearted Productions.

Wolfe released his second album, It All Happened in a Honky Tonk, in September 2010. Five singles were released from the album, all of which reached the top 10 on the Texas Music Chart. Music videos were filmed for four of the singles and they received a combined 1.2 million views on YouTube. The music video for the title track aired on CMT and GAC. Karlie Justus Marlowe of Engine 145 gave the album four stars out of five. Marlowe wrote that it "revels in its familiar take on bourbon, beauties and barrooms" and stated "there’s hardly a throwaway in the bunch." Matt Bjorke of Roughstock also awarded the album four stars out of five, writing that it "showcases a singer/songwriter with a penchant for writing and recording tunes that feel like a good pair of comfortable Wrangler jeans."

In September 2012, Wolfe signed a recording contract with Warner Bros. Nashville. Warner released a deluxe edition of It All Happened in a Honky Tonk in January 2013 with three new songs. The deluxe edition debuted at number 52 on the Billboard Top Country Albums chart. It went on to sell 25,000 copies. A live version of the album, It All Happened Live in a Honky Tonk from Floore's Country Store, was released by Wolfe's Fool Hearted Productions in October.

After the release of the deluxe edition, Wolfe parted ways with Warner and signed with Tone Tree Music. He began working on his third studio album, Natural Man. The album was released on March 31, 2015. Natural Man received a favorable review from Dustin Blumhagen of Country Standard Time, who said that Wolfe "manages to find a comfortable balance between honoring his roots and adding a modern accessibility to his songs." The album debuted at number 25 on the Billboard Top Country Albums chart, selling 2,200 copies in its first week of release.

In June 2017, Wolfe released the album Any Night in Texas.  The album debuted at No. 6 in the Billboard's Heatseekers Albums chart and No. 14 in the Independent Albums chart, selling 2,400 copies in the first week.

Discography

Albums

Singles

Music videos

References

External links

American country singer-songwriters
American male singer-songwriters
Country musicians from Oklahoma
Living people
Midas Records Nashville artists
Musicians from Tulsa, Oklahoma
Warner Records artists
Singer-songwriters from Oklahoma
Year of birth missing (living people)